Climate 200 is an Australian company that provides political funding. It describes itself as a "community crowdfunding initiative" that supports community-backed independents to stand for election to advance climate policy, reduce greenhouse gas emissions by the country and limit climate change in Australia. Its convener told the ABC that the backed candidates "have a shared philosophy on climate change, integrity and gender equity."

The candidates are colloquially grouped by the media as the teal independents, reflecting the campaign colour chosen by some (but not all) of its candidates. The colour teal has been explained as indicating their policies are "a shade between blue Liberal and green."

Background 
The convenor of Climate 200 is Simon Holmes à Court, who was a part of Josh Frydenberg's fundraising group, the Kooyong 200.

With a background in renewable energy and climate policy, Holmes à Court wrote an article in 2018 that was critical of the Coalition's efforts to keep coal fired power stations open. Holmes à Court was thrown out of Frydenburg's group within 24 hours after the article was released, but this gave him an insight into major fundraising for campaigns.

Election campaigns

2019 federal election 
In the lead-up to the 2019 federal election the group raised over $500,000.

2022 federal election 
For the 2022 federal election, the group provided funding for twenty-three candidates who were either independent or running for minor parties, including most of the teal independents. Some of these candidates were also endorsed by Voices groups. They also endorsed additional "values-aligned candidates" without funding them.

The focus of the group was to get more people on the crossbench who aimed to strengthen climate policy and the functioning of parliament.

The group announced a number of high-profile former MPs to join their advisory panel from across the political spectrum.

In October 2021 the group announced that they had raised $2 million in 6 weeks. By December 2021 that had grown to $6.5 million from 6750 donors. The group also conducted polling in some of the seats that they planned to support.

Funded candidates

2022 Victorian state election 
Climate 200 announced their support for a number of independent candidates in the Victorian state election. The candidates were Kate Lardner for Mornington, Melissa Lowe for Hawthorn, Sophie Torney for Kew, and Nomi Kaltmann for Caulfield. No independents won seats at the election, with all incumbent independents being defeated.

Reception 
Climate 200 is a fund that distributes resources to its chosen candidates; however, there are many who claim that it is a political party. Holmes à Court rejected this notion in a February 2022 National Press Club address. He says that the money that the candidates receive have no strings attached and Climate 200 has no control over them. In September 2021, Senator Andrew Bragg wrote to the Australian Electoral Commission to ask them to ensure that group were fulfilling all the requirements for disclosures for political donations. In December 2021, the federal parliament passed a law to require "significant third parties" to register if they spend more than $250,000 on electoral expenditure in a year.

There is a view that Climate 200 is a vehicle for people opposed to the Liberal Party to defeat it in seats that are unwinnable by the Australian Labor Party. The Australian Financial Review in February 2022 described Climate 200 as "an anti-Liberal Party fundraising vehicle controlled by renewable-energy advocate Simon Holmes à Court [which is running] Independents funded by Mr Holmes à Court ... in about 20 Liberal-held seats...". Antony Green, ABC chief elections analyst, stated in April 2022 that these independents are running in "winnable seats ... but these are seats that Labor would never win, the Greens wouldn't win — these are safe Liberal seats."

There were 22 candidates supported by Climate 200 at the 2022 Australian Federal Election. 15 contested Coalition incumbents, 3 were independents who held previously Liberal held seats, and 2 were senate candidates in the ACT where they contested the seat then held by Zed Seselja. Wilkie and Leanne Minshull, an independent Senate candidate in Tasmania, were the only 2  that not directly contesting Coalition held seats. Independents with similar platforms to those endorsed by Climate 200 who ran in Labor held seats, such as Sarina Kilham in Grayndler held by Anthony Albanese, Leader of the Labor Party, were not endorsed. Jo Dyer, the supported candidate in Boothby, a Liberal seat indicated she would support a Labor minority government, and Dr Monique Ryan, the supported candidate in Kooyong, then held by Josh Frydenberg, is a former Labor member.

People involved

Advisors 

 Julia Banks
John Hewson
Barry Jones
Meg Lees
 Rob Oakeshott
 Tony Windsor
 Jim Middleton

Donors 

 Simon Holmes à Court 
 Mike Cannon-Brookes
Naomi Milgrom and family

References

External links

Australian political websites
Internet-based activism
2019 establishments in Australia
Political advocacy groups in Australia
Climate change in Australia
Politics of climate change